TruValu Supermarket is a nationwide and one of the largest supermarket chain in Trinidad and Tobago. Eastern Commercial Lands trading as TruValu Supermarket. Tru Valu was established in 1978 and providing a wide variety of local and international products. 
The company is owned by CL Financial.

References 

Supermarkets of Trinidad and Tobago
Retail companies established in 1978